The Scottish Play: 2004 is a live album and DVD by English rock band Wire. It contains an audio CD of performances at The Triptych Festival at The Tramway Theatre in Glasgow, Scotland and Barbican Hall at Barbican Centre in London, England as well as an accompanying DVD of the same performances. It was released on 25 March 2005.

Track listing

Personnel 

 Production

 Denis Blackham – mastering
 Colin Newman – mixing
 Tom Gidley – direction and editing on DVD tracks 1–14

References

External links 

 

Wire (band) live albums
2005 live albums
Live video albums
2005 video albums
Wire (band) video albums